Discovery Bay International School is a private school and  as well as member of the Federation of British International Schools in Asia.

Founded in 1983 to provide education needs to residents of the new community of Discovery Bay, DBIS provides learning from kindergarten to 6th form. The school is located on Lantau Island and is open to residents across Hong Kong meeting their admission requirements.

Facilities 
DBIS shares the campus with Hong Kong Sheng Kung Hui Discovery Bay Church and S.K.H. Wei Lun Primary School centred on a football field.

References

International schools in Hong Kong
Private schools in Hong Kong
British international schools in Hong Kong
Educational institutions established in 1983
1983 establishments in Hong Kong